Dead to the World is alive video album by American rock band Marilyn Manson.

Dead to the World may also refer to:
 Dead to the World Tour, Marilyn Manson's 1996–1997 tour
 Dead to the World (album), a 2016 album by Helmet
 "Dead to the World", a song by Patti Smith song from Gone Again
 "Dead to the World", a song by Nightwish from Century Child
 "Dead to the World" (iZombie), the first story arc in Chris Roberson's and Michael Allred's iZombie series
 Dead to the World (novel), the fourth novel in Charlaine Harris's Southern Vampire series
 Dead to the World (film), a 1991 Australian film